Leonard J. "Len" Shustek  is an American computing pioneer and chairman of the board of trustees of the Computer History Museum located in Mountain View, California.

Background and career
Shustek received BS and MS from Polytechnic Institute of New York University in Brooklyn, New York. After earning his PhD from Stanford University, he became an assistant professor of computer science at Carnegie Mellon University. After  leaving the faculty, he co-founded Nestar Systems in 1979, and Network General in 1986.  In 2003, he provided a $2.5 million endowment for the "Leonard J. Shustek Distinguished Professor of Computer Science Chair" at Polytechnic Institute of New York University. He has also taught computer science at Stanford University.

In 1972, Shustek proposed using microcode for evaluating the performance of computer systems. He received BS and MS from Polytechnic University in Brooklyn.

In a 1999 interview, Shustek reflected upon the failure of major computer suppliers decades earlier to recognize the need for computer networks.  According to Shustek, computer scientist Harry Saal resigned his position at IBM Santa Teresa Laboratory, because he could not convince IBM to develop local area networks.  Saal then convinced Shustek to give up his position as an associate professor at Carnegie Mellon, and together they founded the networking company Nestar.

References

External links

 In computer infancy, Saal and Shustek convince skeptics to invest in networking.

Living people
Scientists from the San Francisco Bay Area
Carnegie Mellon University faculty
Polytechnic Institute of New York University alumni
Stanford University faculty
Stanford University alumni
American computer scientists
Year of birth missing (living people)